Highway 33 (AR 33, Ark. 33, and Hwy. 33) is a north–south state highway in eastern Arkansas. The highway runs  from Highway 130 north of DeWitt to Highway 37 east of Tupelo. Highway 33 roughly connects four county seats: DeWitt, DeValls Bluff, Des Arc and Augusta. One of the original Arkansas state highways, the highway's routing has remained largely the same since inception, with the exception of one extension in 1956.

Route description
Highway 33 begins at Highway 130 north of DeWitt in Arkansas County on the Grand Prairie in the Arkansas Delta. The highway runs north to a brief overlap with Highway 153 at Lagrue, followed by the western terminus of Highway 33 Spur at Casscoe. Continuing north, the highway reaches a T-intersection with Highway 146. Highway 33 forms a  concurrency with Highway 146 before turning north toward Monroe County.

The route serves as the western terminus for Highway 366 before entering the town of Roe. The routes split north of town, with Highway 33 turning due west and passing the Clarendon Municipal Airport before exiting the county northbound.

Returning to Prairie County, Highway 33 serves has intersections with Highway 86 and Highway 302 and passes farm fields and channel catfish aquaculture ponds before entering DeValls Bluff, one of two county seats of Prairie County. Shortly after entering the city, Highway 33 begins a  concurrency with US 70 through the city, over the White River and into Fredonia (Biscoe). Highway 33 turns north, interchanging with Interstate 40 (I-40) and passing agricultural land on the west side of the road and the Cache River National Wildlife Refuge to the east. The highway has an  overlap with Highway 38 east of Des Arc until meeting the Woodruff County line at Little Dixie.

Upon entering Woodruff County, Highway 33 continue north along the western edge of the Cache River NWR, encountering Highway 262 twice and passing through Gregory. The road intersects Highway 260 before nearing Augusta and intersecting with Highway 33 City. Highway 33 bypasses Augusta to the east before meeting US 64 and beginning an overlap around Augusta's northeastern city limits.

History
Highway 33 was an original Arkansas state highway, running from Roe to Tupelo in Jackson County. The highway was extended south from US 79 in Roe to its current southern terminus by the Arkansas State Highway Commission (ASHC) on May 9, 1956. Highway 33's original alignment through Augusta was restored to the state highway system in 1956 as Highway 33 City. The alignment was shifted slightly in 1970 to pass by the Clarendon Municipal Airport.

Major intersections

Auxiliary routes
Arkansas Highway 33 has two total auxiliary routes. Hwy. 33 spur is a short spur route near Casscoe serving as a connector to a residential area near the White River. Hwy. 33 City is a business route in Augusta serving the downtown business district while the parent route bypasses the city to the east and north.

Casscoe spur

The route runs east from Highway 33 to a residential area near the White River.

Major intersections

Augusta city route

Route description

Highway 33C begins at Highway 33 southeast of Augusta. The highway runs due west into the city's southern portion, or New Augusta., as Gregory St. In the city limits, Highway 33C curves north and becomes 6th St, turns west becoming Sycamore St and turns again north on 3rd St. Highway 33 City begins an overlap with U.S. Route 64 Business (US 64B) at Main St, and the two highways pass through the Augusta Commercial Historic District. Now in the oldest part of Augusta, the highways are also paralleled by the Augusta History Walk. Highway 33 passes the Ferguson House, Augusta Presbyterian Church and Woodruff County Courthouse, all listed on the National Register of Historic Places before turning onto Magnolia St, passing the Augusta Memorial Park, turning onto 5th St, and terminating at US 64.

History
Highway 33's original alignment through Augusta was restored to the state highway system in 1956 as Highway 33 City.

Major intersections

See also

 List of state highways in Arkansas

References

External links

033
Transportation in Arkansas County, Arkansas
Transportation in Prairie County, Arkansas
Transportation in Monroe County, Arkansas
Transportation in Woodruff County, Arkansas
Transportation in Jackson County, Arkansas